Vanessa Clare Harwood,  (born 14 June 1947) is a Canadian ballet dancer, choreographer, artistic director, 
teacher, and actor.

Born in Cheltenham, England, Harwood was one of the first pupils at The National Ballet School of Canada in Toronto when it opened in 1959. She joined the National Ballet of Canada in 1965, became a soloist in 1967, and was a principal dancer from 1970 to 1987.  Harwood was celebrated for her portrayal of Odette-Odile in Swan Lake, and came to be known as Superswan because of her mastery of the demanding dual role.

As an actor, Harwood had minor roles in Road to Avonlea and Due South. As a choreographer, she makes an uncredited appearance in the introductory sequence of "Poison à la Carte" a 2002 episode of A Nero Wolfe Mystery.

In 1984, Harwood was made an Officer of the Order of Canada. She is also an Advisory Council member of the Dancer Transition Resource Centre.

As of 1969, she was a resident of the Town of Mississauga.

References

External links
 Vanessa Harwood at The Canadian Encyclopedia
 

1947 births
Living people
Canadian ballerinas
Canadian female dancers
Canadian television actresses
English emigrants to Canada
National Ballet of Canada principal dancers
Officers of the Order of Canada
People from Cheltenham
Prima ballerinas